The Tift County Courthouse, built in 1912-1913, is a historic courthouse building located in Tifton, Georgia. It was designed  by Atlanta-based architect William Augustus Edwards who designed one other courthouse in Georgia, two in Florida and nine in South Carolina as well as academic buildings at 12 institutions in Florida, Georgia and South Carolina. On September 18, 1980, it was added to the National Register of Historic Places.

See also
National Register of Historic Places listings in Tift County, Georgia (includes the courthouse)

References

External links 
 National Register listings for Tift County
 University of Florida biography of William Augustus Edwards
 

Courthouses on the National Register of Historic Places in Georgia (U.S. state)
Buildings and structures in Tift County, Georgia
County courthouses in Georgia (U.S. state)
William Augustus Edwards buildings
National Register of Historic Places in Tift County, Georgia